Shrigonda is a municipal council in Ahmednagar district in the Indian state of Maharashtra. It has an average elevation of 561 metres (1840 feet). Per 2001 India census, Shrigonda had a population of 26,331. Males constitute 52% of the population and females 48%. Shrigonda has an average literacy rate of 71%, higher than the national average of 59.5%: male literacy is 77%, and female literacy is 64%. In Shrigonda, 12% of the population is under 6 years of age.

See also 
 Shrigonda Municipal Council
 Ahmednagar district

References

Talukas in Maharashtra
Cities and towns in Ahmednagar district